Pucker factor is a military slang phrase used to describe the level of stress and/or adrenaline response to danger or a crisis situation. The term refers to the tightening of the sphincter caused by extreme fear. The term applies only to an individual's response in a crisis situation; it does not pertain to an individual's stress levels outside of a crisis context.

Pucker factor (PF) is usually quantified on a scale of 1 to 10, with a higher value relating to higher anxiety.  That said, neither a low nor a high pucker factor is necessarily good.  A low value reflects an absence of a situationally appropriate stress response, which absence can be symptomatic of psychosis.  Persons with low PF may make decisions "like a robot" without considering ethics or the long-term consequences of their actions.  Conversely, if PF is excessive, then the person "puckers" – leading to panic, wherein the person is unable to think clearly and act effectively.

See also
Stress 
Fear 
Panic 
Anxiety

References

Military slang and jargon
Buttocks
Psychological stress
Scales